Iltifatganj Bazar is a town and a nagar panchayat in Ambedaker Nagar district in the Indian state of Uttar Pradesh.

Demographics
 India census, Iltifatganj Bazar had a population of 11,339. Males constitute 52% of the population and females 48%. Iltifatganj Bazar has an average literacy rate of 55%, lower than the national average of 59.5%: male literacy is 60%, and female literacy is 49%. In Iltifatganj Bazar, 20% of the population is under 6 years of age.

References

Cities and towns in Ambedkar Nagar district